"The Devil's Coach Horses" is a 1925 essay by J. R. R. Tolkien ("devil's coach horse" is the common name of a particular kind of rove beetle).

Tolkien draws attention to the devil's steeds called eaueres in Hali Meidhad, translated "boar" in the Early English Text Society edition of 1922, but in reference to the  jumenta "yoked team, draught horse" of Joel, in the Vulgata Clementina computruerunt jumenta in stercore suo (the Nova Vulgata has semina for Hebrew  "grain").

Rather than from the Old English word for "boar", eofor (German Eber) Tolkien derives the word from  eafor "packhorse", from a verb aferian "transport", related to Middle English aver "draught-horse", a word surviving in northern dialects. The Proto-Germanic root *ab- "energy, vigour, labour" of the word is cognate to Latin opus.

References

External links
 Full text of "The Devil's Coach Horses" at HathiTrust Digital Library

Essays by J. R. R. Tolkien
1925 essays